David Cross (born 23 April 1949 in Turnchapel near Plymouth, England) is an English electric violinist and keyboardist best known for playing with progressive rock band King Crimson from 1972 to 1974. He appears on their studio albums Larks' Tongues in Aspic, Starless and Bible Black, and a single track on Red. Cross also appears on numerous other live recordings from 1973 & 1974 that have been released by Robert Fripp's Discipline Global Mobile label in the decades since, including USA (1975) and The Night Watch (1997).After his time with King Crimson, Cross travelled extensively, eventually returning to music through work in the theatre. In 1987 he formed an ensemble called Low Flying Aircraft with Keith Tippett on piano. In 1988, he was invited by keyboardist Geoff Serle to join Radius, with whom he has recorded five studio albums.

Since the late 1980s, he has toured and recorded with his own eponymous band (see below). Over a 30 year period, the group has included saxophonist Pete McPhail, guitarists Paul Clark and Peter Claridge, bassists Simon Murrell, John Dillon (who also sang lead vocals) and Mick Paul, drummers Dan Maurer, Lloyd, Craig Blundell, Steve Roberts and Pat Garvey, keyboardists Sheila Maloney and Alex Hall, and lead singers Arch Stanton and Jinian Wilde. Former (and current) King Crimson musicians John Wetton, Robert Fripp and Pat Mastelotto, as well as former Crimson lyricists Peter Sinfield and Richard Palmer-James have all contributed to David’s albums.

Prominent session work includes recordings with Clearlight, Jade Warrior and Tony Levin’s Stick Men (with whom Cross toured).

Recently, Cross has released a series of duo recordings with Robert Fripp, Andrew Keeling, Andrew Booker (of No-Man), David Jackson (formerly of Van der Graaf Generator) and Peter Banks (formerly of Yes), the latter two including a full band.

Cross has composed music for theatre and worked as an actor as well. He runs his own record label, Noisy Records.

David Cross Band
The David Cross Band was established in 1988/89. The first edition of the group consisted of keyboardist Sheila Maloney, bassist Simon Murrell (soon replaced by bassist & vocalist John Dillon), saxophonist Pete McPhail and drummer Dan Maurer. The longest serving members of the group are guitarist Paul Clark (since 1994) and bassist Mick Paul (since 1995). The David Cross Band have released seven albums that blend elements of progressive rock, heavy metal, classical, ambient, jazz and experimental music.

Academic work
Cross has been a senior lecturer in Music Education at London Metropolitan University.

 Discography 

With King Crimson
 Larks' Tongues in Aspic (1973)
 Starless and Bible Black (1974)
 Red (1974) (“Providence” only)

Live albums
 USA (1975) (recorded in June, 1974)
 The Great Deceiver (1992) (boxed set, 1973–1974)
 The Night Watch (1997) (recorded in November, 1973)

With Robert Fripp
 Starless Starlight (2015)

Solo / David Cross Band
 Memos from Purgatory (1989) 
 The Big Picture (1992) (David Cross Band)
 Testing to Destruction (1994) (David Cross Band)
 Exiles (1997) (David Cross Band + guests)
 Closer Than Skin (2005) (David Cross Band)
 Alive in the Underworld (2008) (David Cross Band)
 Sign of the Crow (2016) (David Cross Band)
 Crossing the tracks (2018)

With Naomi Maki Unbounded (2006)

With Radius

 Arc Measuring (1988)
 Sightseeing (1989)
 Elevation (1992)
 There Is No Peace (1995)
 Civilisations (2000)

With Andrew Keeling
 English Sun (2009)

Collaborations
 The Butterfly Ball (With Rod Edwards and Roger Hand) (1975)
 Clearlight: Forever Blowing Bubbles (1975)
 Paul Egan: Island of Dreams (1978)
 Shock Headed Peters: Life Extinguisher EP (1986)
 Low Flying Aircraft: Low Flying Aircraft (1987)
 Danielle Dax: "Blast The Human Flower" (1990)
 Jade Warrior: Distant Echoes (1993)
 Rime of the Ancient Sampler: A Mellotron Compilation (1993)
 Joe Hisaishi: Chijou no Rakuen (1994)
 Stick Men + featuring David Cross: Midori (2016)
 David Cross and Sean Quinn: Cold Sky Blue (2016)
 David Cross and David Jackson: Another Day (2018)
 David Cross and Andrew Booker: Ends Meeting (2018)
 David Cross and Peter Banks: Crossover (2020)

Theatre
1995: That World'' by Dean Allen - role of 'Shades' (Hades)

References

External links
 David Cross and Noisy Records

1948 births
Living people
musicians from Plymouth, Devon
English keyboardists
English violinists
British male violinists
King Crimson members
Academics of London Metropolitan University
British rock violinists
21st-century violinists